Fabio Novembre (21 October 1966) is an Italian architect and designer.

Biography
He moved to Milan in 1984, where in 1992 he received a degree in architecture.
In 1993 he lived in New York City where he attended a filmmaking course at the New York University. In 1994, he was commissioned to design his first project: the “Anna Molinari Blumarine” shop in London. In the same year he opened his own studio in Milan.

From 2000 until 2003 he worked  as Art Director at Bisazza, contributing in the international growth of the mosaic tile brand.
Since 2001 he has worked for Italian design brands such as Cappellini, Driade, Meritalia, Flaminia and Casamania.

In 2008, on behalf of the Municipality of Milan, the Rotonda di Via Besana museum housed an exhibition about his work, "Teach me the freedom of swallows”. In 2009, the Triennale Design Museum of Milan, invited Novembre to curate and design an exhibition on his work: “Il fiore di Novembre”. In 2010, the City of Milan was represented by an installation that he designed and curated in the Pavilion of Italy at Expo in Shanghai.

In 2009, Novembre designed an art installation, titled Per fare un albero, ‘To make a tree’, in conjunction with the city of Milan's Department of Design, Events and Fashion and Fiat — featuring 20 full-size fiberglass planter replicas of the company's 500C cabriolet along Via Monte Napoleone, Milan's fashion center. The installation lasted several months.

2011 is the photography year: after art-directing of the exhibition “Lavazza con te partirò” at the Teatro dell'Arte of the Triennale of Milan on the occasion of the 20th anniversary of the company's calendar; he also designed and curated the Steve McCurry exhibition at MACRO Testaccio, Rome.
In April 2012 he signs the new exhibition setting for the fifth edition of Triennale Design Museum.
In 2014, Casa Milan, the new headquarters of the A.C. Milan, were open, where all interiors are designed by Fabio Novembre.

Works

Architecture
 Anna Molinari Blumarine store, Hong Kong and London (1994), Singapore, Hong Kong and Taipei (1995)
 Cafè l’Atlantique bar-restaurant, Milan, 1995
 B Square store, Hong Kong, 1996
 Blu discothèque, Lodi, 1997
 ON Natural Wellness Center, Milan, 1997
 bar Lodi, Lodi, 1998
 SHU bar-restaurant, Milan, 1999
 Via Spiga showroom, Milan, 1999
 Li Cuncheddi hotel, Olbia, 2000
 Tardini store, New York City, 2000
 Divina discothèque, Milan, 2001
 UNA Hotel Vittoria hotel, Florence, 2003
 Bisazza stands, Stuttgart and Bologna (2000), New Orleans, Bologna and London (2001)
 Bisazza showroom, Barcelona (2001), Milan (2002), New York and Berlin (2003)
 Novembre house/office, Milan, 2004
 Meltin’ Pot stands, Berlin and Barcelona (2005), Florence (2008)
 Meltin’ Pot showroom, New York (2005), Milan, (by SICIS The Art Mosaic Factory )(2006)
 Stuart Weitzman store, Rome (2006), Beijing and Beverly Hills (2007), Hong Kong, New York and Paris (2008)
 Margherita e Co. shop in shop, Bergamo, 2008
 ALV showroom, Milan, 2009
 Moscara restaurant, Milan, 2010
 "HIT Gallery", Hong Kong, 2012
 "Who's Who", Milan, 2013
 "Who's Who", Rome, 2014
 "Carpisa", Naples, 2014
 "Carpisa", Milan, 2014
 "Casa Milan", A.C. Milan, Milan, 2014

Design
 Honlywood chair, for B&B Italia, 1988
 Mediterranea chaise longue, for Bonacina, 1991
 Bottle prototype, for Uliveto, 1995
 ORG table, for Cappellini, 2001
 NET carpet, for Cappellini, 2001
 AND sitting system, for Cappellini, 2002
 S.O.S. Sofa Of Solitude armchair and chaise longue, for Cappellini, 2003
 Point of purchase products, for Meltin’ Pot, 2005
 RPH sofa, for Cappellini, 2006
 Air Lounge System collection, for Meritalia, 2006
 +13 plus one tree pot, for Casamania, 2007
 maniglie Love Opens Doors handle collection, for Fusital, 2007
 Moving Fashion Award, for Il Sole 24 ore, 2007
 100 Piazze trays, for Driade, 2007
 SW416 small table, for Meritalia, 2007
 HIM&HER chairs, for Casamania, 2008
 STFS Slow The Flow System water tap, for Stella, 2008
 Void System sanitary ware Line, for Flaminia, 2008
 DIVINA sofa, for Driade, 2008
 SEC armchair, for Cappellini, 2008
 Histograms armchair and table, for Gispen, 2008
 Magic Carpet, for Cappellini, 2008
 Green Line vase, for Bitossi, 2009
 Joy baby chair, for Casamania, 2009
 Nemo chair, for Driade, 2010
 Luciola lamp, for Driade, 2010
 Abath chair, for Casamania, 2010
 OK stool, for Kartell, 2011
 Robox bookshelf, for Casamania, 2011
 Strip chair, for Casamania, 2011
 HP, for Wallpaper and Reebok, 2011
 Happy Pills vase, for Venini, 2012
 36h 56h chair, for Driade, 2012
 Murana vase, for Venini, 2012
 World's best glassware, for RCR, 2013
 F3 outdoor furniture, for Vondom, 2013
 Boom lamp, for Venini, 2013
 Love Hurts Eventually ring, 2013
 Jolly Roger chair, for Gufram, 2013
 I Have a Lifestyle window display, for Tommy Hilfiger, 2013
 In punta di piedi table, 2015

Exhibitions, Shows, Installations
 Installation Nuovamente, exhibition on recycle, Milan, 1996
 Installation Love over all, Paris, 2002
 Installation Casa, Verona, 2003
 Installation Skybaby, Milan, 2005
 Installation Philips Transition: Light on the move, Milan, 2007
 Exhibition Teach me the freedom of swallows, Milan.
 Exhibition Il fiore di Novembre (The Novembre's flower), Milan, 2009
 Installation Per fare un albero with Fiat 500, Milan, Paris, Madrid, Capri, 2009/2010
 Installation Milano creative City, Italian Pavilion, Expo Shanghai, 2010
 Exhibition Unexpected Guests - Homes of Yesteryear, Design of Today at the Museo Poldi Pezzoli at Milan, 2010
 Installation The Rainbow Thieves, Moscow, 2010
 Installation Per fare un albero for Fiat, Milan, 2010
 Installation Ieri, Oggi, Domani, Milan, 2010
 Exhibition Franko B I still love, Milan, 2010
 Installation Bang for Lasvit, Milan, 2011
 Exhibition Lavazza Con te partirò, Milan, 2011
 Exhibition Steve McCurry, Rome, 2011
 Exhibition TDM5, at Triennale Design Museum, Milan, 2012
 Installation Stay Human for BMW, Rome, 2012
 Exhibition Seconda Pelle for A.C. Milan, at  Triennale Design Museum, Milan, 2012
 Event Lapsus for Gufram, Milan, 2013
 Installation Here I Am for IMIB, Milan, 2014
 Installation We Dance for Lexus, Milan, 2014
 Installation Salone del Gusto for Lavazza, Turin, 2014
 Installation The Earth Defenders for Lavazza, at Eataly, Milan, 2014
 Installation Who Are You? for Replay, Milan, 2015
 Bar Lavazza Expo 2015 for Lavazza, at Expo Milano 2015 Milan, 2015
 Exhibition From These Hands: A Journey Along the Coffee Trail, for Lavazza and Steve McCurry at Museo della Scienza e della Tecnologia "Leonardo da Vinci", Milan, 2015
 Exhibition The Trophy Factory for A.C. Milan, at Casa Milan, Milan, 2015

Lectures and Workshops
 Faculty of Architecture, Delft Netherlands, 2001
 Faculty of Architecture, Milan Italy, 2001
 Katoenveem, Rotterdam Netherlands, 2001
 Faculty of Architecture, Palermo, 2002
 Contract World Event, Hannover Germany, 2003
 Faculty of Architecture, Düsseldorf Germany, 2003
 Seoul Living Design Fair, Seoul Korea, 2003
 Architecture and Water workshop, Havana Cuba, 2003
 Royal Institute of British Architects, London United Kingdom, 2004
 Il mosaico tra arte e architettura, Palazzo Ducale, Genoa, 2005
 Clubovka Event, Bratislava Slovakia, 2005
 Interview with Vico Magistretti, Palazzo Reale, Milan, 2005
 The Visual Power Show, Eindhoven Netherlands, 2005
 L’architettura spiegata ai bambini, Palazzo della Triennale, Milan, 2005
 I Saloni WorldWide, Moscow Russia, 2005
 Future Design Days, Stockholm Sweden, nel 2005
 IV International Architecture and Construction Forum, São Paulo Brazil, 2006
 University of Lecce, Lecce Italy, 2006
 Italian Design Talks I Saloni 2007, London and New York City, 2007	
 Trendboard Workshop, Cologne Germany, 2007
 The Great Indoors Award, Maastricht Netherlands, 2007
 Exotica Event, Tel Aviv Israel, 2007
 Tasmeen Doha Design Conference, Doha Qatar, 2008
 Festival dell’ Architettura, Cagliari Italy, 2008
 Vitra Workshop, Boisbuchet France, 2008
 Interieur ’08, Kortrijk Belgium, 2008

Publications
 A Sud di Memphis, Idea Books, Milan, 1995 
 Be your own Messiah, Milan, 2001
 Tra la contemporaneità degli input e la primordialità degli output, Abitare n.471, April 2007
 A chi e a che cosa serve un Museo del Design?, Abitare n.480, March 2008
 Why I created a table with 171 legs, L’uomo Vogue n.390, April 2008
 Il  pesce fuor d’acqua, Velvet n.18, May 2008
 Il design spiegato a mia madre, Rizzoli, Milan, 2011

References

Sources
Giuliana Gramigna Paola Biondi, Il design in Italia, Umberto Allemandi &C., Turin, Italy 1999, p. 344
Leo Gullbring, Fabio Novembre, Frame-Birkhauser, Amsterdam, Netherlands 2001
editor Emilia Terragni, Spoon, Phaidon Press Limited, London, United Kingdom 2002, pp. 272–275
editor Katey Day, Designers on design by Terence Conran and Max Fraser, Conran Octopus Limited, London, U.K. 2004, p. 184-185
editor Jennifer Hudson, Interior Architecture now, Laurence King Publishing Ltd, London, U.K. 2007, pp. 210–215
editor Andrea Branzi, Capire il design, Giunti Editore S.p.A., Florence, Italy 2007, pp. 255–256
Beppe Finessi, Fabio Novembre, Skira Editore, Milan, Italy 2008

External links 

 

1966 births
People from Lecce
Architects from Milan
Italian industrial designers
Italian graphic designers
Italian designers
Modernist architects
Living people